The men's 1500 metres event at the 2015 European Athletics U23 Championships was held in Tallinn, Estonia, at Kadriorg Stadium on 9 and 11 July.

Medalists

Results

Final
11 July

Heats
9 July

Heat 1

Heat 2

Participation
According to an unofficial count, 23 athletes from 17 countries participated in the event.

References

1500 metres
1500 metres at the European Athletics U23 Championships